Nicolas Antonio, O.P.  was a Roman Catholic prelate who served as Bishop of Salpi (1422–?) and Bishop of Lucera (1394–1422).

Biography
Nicolas Antonio was ordained a priest in the Order of Preachers.
On 4 Jul 1394, he was appointed during the papacy of Pope Boniface IX as Bishop of Lucera.
On 22 Apr 1422, he was appointed during the papacy of Pope Martin V as Bishop of Salpi.
It is uncertain how long he served as Bishop of Salpi. 
While bishop, he was the principal co-consecrator of Antonio Ventura, Bishop of Croatia (1425); and Filippo Ventorelli, Bishop of Amelia (1426).

References

External links and additional sources
 (for Chronology of Bishops)
 (for Chronology of Bishops)
 (for Chronology of Bishops)  
 (for Chronology of Bishops)  

14th-century Italian Roman Catholic bishops
15th-century Italian Roman Catholic bishops
Bishops appointed by Pope Boniface IX
Bishops appointed by Pope Martin V
Dominican bishops